Stephen Roche (born 31 December 1992) is an Irish hurler who plays for Waterford Championship club Mount Sion and at inter-county level with the Waterford senior hurling team. He usually lines out as a midfielder.

References

1992 births
Living people
Mount Sion hurlers
Waterford inter-county hurlers